Francesco Maria Della Rovere (Genoa, 13 February 1695 - Genoa, 23 May 1768) was the 168th Doge of the Republic of Genoa, the last member of the Genoese branch of the Della Rovere family.

Biography 
During his mandate as Doge of Genoa, he commissioned new conservation and restoration works for the Doge's Palace, the residence of the doge in charge and seat of political power for the presence of the Major and Minor Council of the Republic of Genoa. He also maintained good relations with the Holy See in Rome and also thanks to his Roman knowledge he favored the cardinal election of the Genoese Nicolò Serra and Lazzaro Pallavicini. When the dogal office ended on 29 January 1767, Francesco Maria Della Rovere died in Genoa on 23 May 1768. Having had no children from his wife Caterina Negrone, daughter of the former doge Domenico Negrone, the Genoese noble branch of the Della Rovere family went extinct.

See also 
 Republic of Genoa
 Doge of Genoa

Sources 
 Buonadonna, Sergio. Rosso doge. I dogi della Repubblica di Genova dal 1339 al 1797.

18th-century Doges of Genoa
1695 births
1768 deaths